In orbital mechanics, the eccentric anomaly is an angular parameter that defines the position of a body that is moving along an elliptic Kepler orbit. The eccentric anomaly is one of three angular parameters ("anomalies") that define a position along an orbit, the other two being the true anomaly and the mean anomaly.

Graphical representation

Consider the ellipse with equation given by:

where a is the semi-major axis and b is the semi-minor axis.

For a point on the ellipse, P = P(x, y), representing the position of an orbiting body in an elliptical orbit, the eccentric anomaly is the angle E in the figure. The eccentric anomaly E in terms of these coordinates is given by:

and

The second equation is established using the relationship
,

which implies that . The equation  is immediately able to be ruled out since it traverses the ellipse in the wrong direction. It can also be noted that the second equation can be viewed as coming from a similar triangle with its opposite side having the same length y as the distance from P to the major axis, and its hypotenuse b equal to the semi-minor axis of the ellipse.

Formulas

Radius and eccentric anomaly
The eccentricity e is defined as:

From Pythagoras's theorem applied to the triangle with r (a distance FP) as hypotenuse:

Thus, the radius (distance from the focus to point P) is related to the eccentric anomaly by the formula

With this result the eccentric anomaly can be determined from the true anomaly as shown next.

From the true anomaly
The true anomaly is the angle labeled  in the figure, located at the focus of the ellipse. The true anomaly and the eccentric anomaly are related as follows.

Hence,

Angle  is therefore the adjacent angle of a right triangle with hypotenuse  adjacent side  and opposite side 

Also,

where

is called "the semi-latus rectum" in classical geometry.

From the mean anomaly

The eccentric anomaly E is related to the mean anomaly M by Kepler's equation:

This equation does not have a closed-form solution for E given M. It is usually solved by numerical methods, e.g. the Newton–Raphson method. It may be expressed in a Fourier series as

where  is the Bessel function of the first kind.

See also
Eccentricity vector
Orbital eccentricity

Notes and references

Sources
 Murray, Carl D.; & Dermott, Stanley F. (1999); Solar System Dynamics, Cambridge University Press, Cambridge, GB
 Plummer, Henry C. K. (1960); An Introductory Treatise on Dynamical Astronomy, Dover Publications, New York, NY (Reprint of the 1918 Cambridge University Press edition)

Orbits

de:Exzentrische Anomalie